Peacetika is the fourth studio album by the Minneapolis-based noise rock band Cows. It was released on March 25, 1991, by Amphetamine Reptile Records. The band supported the album with a North American tour.

Critical reception

Trouser Press opined that "the spectacular 'Hitting the Wall' begins the album with pounding and whistling organized mayhem, which the weaker following tracks can't equal."

In 2005, City Pages listed "Hitting the Wall" as one of "Minnesota's Fifty Greatest Hits", writing: "Am-Rep's leading lights corral their mondo-hate-scum-boogie into something like a pop song without diluting Shannon Selberg's stay-away-from-me scream or Thor Eisentrager and Kevin Rutmanis's guitar-bass katzenjammer."

Track listing

Personnel
Adapted from the Peacetika liner notes.

Cows
Thor Eisentrager – guitar
Norm Rogers – drums
Kevin Rutmanis – bass guitar
Shannon Selberg – vocals, bugle

Production and additional personnel
Cows – production
Tim Mac – production, engineering

Release history

References

External links 
 Peacetika at Discogs (list of releases)

1991 albums
Cows (band) albums
Amphetamine Reptile Records albums